Vachinius is a genus of beetles in the family Carabidae, containing the following species:

 Vachinius burmanensis Lassalle, 2001 
 Vachinius deuvei Morvan, 1997 
 Vachinius pilosus Casale, 1984 
 Vachinius pseudoglaber Casale, 1984 
 Vachinius subglaber Andrewes, 1937
 Vachinius thailandensis Morvan, 1992 
 Vachinius wrasei Kirschenhofer, 2003 
 Vachinius holzschuhi Casale, 1984 
 Vachinius hunanus Morvan, 1997

References

Licininae